Yolmo or Hyolmo may refer to:
 Yolmo people, an indigenous group of Nepal
 Yolmo language, the Sino-Tibetan language spoken by them